The Sulegg is a mountain of the Bernese Alps, overlooking Saxeten in the Bernese Oberland. It lies on the group between the Saxettal and the Soustal, on the left side of the Lauterbunnen valley.

References

External links

 Sulegg on Hikr

Bernese Alps
Mountains of the Alps
Mountains of Switzerland
Mountains of the canton of Bern
Two-thousanders of Switzerland